Le Journal de Tanger is a French-language local daily newspaper based in Tangier, Morocco. Founded in 1904 it is one of the oldest publications in the country.

History and profile
Le Journal de Tanger, published in French, was established in 1904. The paper is a local daily and is headquartered in Tangier. In the 1940s it was published on a weekly basis.

See also
 List of newspapers in Morocco

References

External links

1904 establishments in Morocco
French-language newspapers published in Morocco
Mass media in Tangier
Newspapers published in Morocco
Publications established in 1904